is a private Buddhist girls' secondary school in Abeno-ku, Osaka.

In 1909 the school was first established.  it had 1,406 students. It is a member of the Alliance of Girls' Schools Australasia.

References

External links
 Ohtani Junior and Senior High School

Abeno-ku, Osaka
Schools in Osaka
1909 establishments in Japan
Educational institutions established in 1909
High schools in Osaka Prefecture
Girls' schools in Japan